The 2014–15 Illinois State Redbirds men's basketball team represented Illinois State University during the 2014–15 NCAA Division I men's basketball season. The Redbirds, led by third-year head coach Dan Muller, played their home games at Redbird Arena in Normal, Illinois as a member of the Missouri Valley Conference. They finished the season 22–13, 11–7 in conference play, to finish in a tie for third place. As the number four seed in the MVC tournament, they defeated Evansville in a quarterfinal game and eighth ranked Wichita State in a semifinal game before succumbing to eleventh ranked Northern Iowa in the final. They received an at-large bid to the National Invitation Tournament where they won over Green Bay in the first round before losing to Old Dominion in the second round.

On April 7, following the conclusion of the NCAA tournament title game, deputy director of athletics Aaron Leetch and men's basketball associate head coach Torrey Ward were among seven people who perished during an airplane crash of a twin-engine Cessna 414 in a soybean field on the eastern outskirts of Bloomington, Illinois.  The flight, which originated from an Indianapolis airport, was en route to Central Illinois Regional Airport.
<ref
name = "Illinois crash"
>

</ref>

Previous season 
The Redbirds finished the 2013–14 season 18–16, 9–9 in conference play, to finish in a tie for fourth place. For the Missouri Valley tournament they were the number five seed and were defeated by Missouri State in a quarterfinal game. They accepted an invitation to the College Basketball Invitational where they were victorious over Morehead State in the first round and Texas A&M in the quarterfinal round before losing to Siena in the semifinal round.

Offseason

Departures

Arrivals

Transfers

Roster

Schedule and results

|-
!colspan=9 style=|Exhibition Season

|-
!colspan=9 style=|Non-conference regular season

|-
!colspan=9 style=|Missouri Valley Conference regular season

|-
!colspan=9 style=|State FarmMissouri Valley Conference {MVC} Tournament
|-

|-
!colspan=9 style=|National Invitation {NIT} Tournament
|-

|-

Source

References

Illinois State Redbirds men's basketball seasons
Illinois State
Illinois State Redbirds men's basketball
Illinois State Redbirds men's basketball
Illinois State Redbirds